John Gijsbert Alan "Johnny" Heitinga (born 15 November 1983) is a Dutch football coach and a former player who played as a centre back. He is currently the manager of Ajax.

A product of the Ajax Youth Academy, he played for their first squad from 2001 to 2008. After a one-year spell at Atlético Madrid in Spain, he signed for Everton in 2009. Joining Fulham for six months in January 2014, he then signed with German side Hertha BSC the following summer, signing a two-year deal with the club from Berlin. In June 2015 he returned to his first club Ajax.

Since his debut for Dutch national team in February 2004, Heitinga has over 85 caps, and he has represented his country at two World Cups (2006 and 2010) and three European Championships (2004, 2008, and 2012). In 2008, Heitinga was named Dutch Footballer of the Year. He is of mixed Dutch and Indo ancestry.

Club career

Ajax
Heitinga was part of the AFC Ajax youth team before making his debut for the first team on 26 August 2001 against Feyenoord. He was part a new wave of talent that fielded the likes of homegrown stars Rafael van der Vaart and Wesley Sneijder, as well as Zlatan Ibrahimović and Cristian Chivu. He was featured in a documentary entitled Ajax: Hark the Herald Angel Sings alongside Ajax academy pupils Gregory van der Wiel, Mitchell Donald, Jeffrey Sarpong, Donovan Slijngard, Nordin Amrabat, Evander Sno, and Jeremain Lens.

Heitinga quickly established himself as a strong addition to the team and became first-choice player under coach Co Adriaanse and later Ronald Koeman until he suffered a serious knee injury which kept him on the sidelines for over six months. His comeback was short-lived, as he played only one game before suffering yet another injury which again sentenced him to a long period of recovery.

He made his second comeback at the start of the 2003–04 season and impressed in his first game since injury against FC Volendam, from where he went on to become a first choice central defender for the remainder of the season as well as a popular figure amongst the fans. When it was announced that he would be leaving Ajax at the end of the 2007–08 season, the fans gave him a fitting send-off by displaying a mosaic of him on the stands.

Atlético Madrid 
Heitinga moved to Atlético Madrid at the end of the 2007–08 season for a fee of £8.8 million. His first season in Spain ended with Heitinga making 32 appearances – 27 in La Liga – and scoring three goals for Atlético.

Everton 
In September 2009, aged 25, Heitinga joined English Premier League club Everton on a five-year contract for a fee of around €7.04 million (£6.2 million). He was given squad number 5, though he was not eligible to represent Everton in the UEFA Europa League, having already played for Atlético Madrid in the qualifying stage of the Champions League. Heitinga made his debut for Everton on 13 September against Fulham after coming on for the injured Phil Neville. In his first season for the club, Heitinga made 35 appearances in all competitions. He played mostly as defensive midfielder, covering the absence of several players and showing great spirit and adaptability.

In the 2010–11 FA Cup, Everton held holders Chelsea 1–1 in a replay at Stamford Bridge, sending the tie to penalties. Heitinga took Everton's fourth and scored.  Phil Neville went on to score the winning penalty for Everton. Later that season, Heitinga scored his first goal for the club in a 1–1 draw at home to Birmingham City. Heitinga was voted Everton's Player of the Season for 2011–12 by the club's supporters. He finally had an extended run of play as centre back, showing the passion and the commanding skills he always put on the field in the orange shirt. He then scored against Newcastle on the final day of the season with an unmarked header which put Everton 3–0, his second Premier League goal and his first in over 14 months.

The 2012–13 season proved to be less successful for Heitinga as manager David Moyes opted to play Phil Jagielka and Sylvain Distin for much of Everton's season. Heitinga had to wait until an injury to Jagielka gave him a sustained run in the team but poor performances which included him being culpable for all three goals in a 3–3 draw with Aston Villa led to him being criticised by fans. However, in April Moyes praised Heitinga's mental strength for battling back after his earlier form in the season would have "broken" most players. Despite this, Heitinga revealed that he had rejected Everton's offer of a new contract at the end of the year. In January 2014 Everton and West Ham United agreed terms for the transfer of Heitinga. He turned down the move however saying, "You have to be convinced that you are taking the right step and I was not". He scored his last goal for the team in his last outing, Everton's 4–0 FA Cup win against Stevenage before eventually joining Fulham on a free transfer on transfer deadline day.

Fulham 
On 31 January 2014, Heitinga signed for Fulham for a six-month deal on a free transfer. In a 3–1 loss against Chelsea on 1 March, Heitinga scored the only goal for Fulham. On 23 May 2014 he was released from the club at the end of his contract.

Hertha BSC 
Heitinga signed a two-year contract with German club Hertha BSC in June 2014.

Return to Ajax 
On 25 June 2015, Ajax announced that Heitinga would return to the club, joining on a free transfer from German side Hertha BSC. He signed a one-year contract with the option of a second year. However, after playing only two Eredivisie matches in the first half of the season, Heitinga decided to retire from professional football on 1 February 2016.

International career 

Having been part of Dutch international youth teams, Heitinga made his senior debut for the Netherlands on 18 February 2004 in a friendly game against the United States and made an immediate impact. Several months later, he scored his first goal from a Rafael van der Vaart free kick in a friendly against Greece.

Euro 2004 
Although he did not take part in qualifying, Heitinga was later included in the squad for the Euro 2004 in Portugal since the Dutch under-21 team had failed to qualify for the European Championships. He started as first choice right back in the first two group stage matches but was suspended for the last match when he was sent-off for two bookable offences. After serving his suspension, he returned in the quarter-final against Sweden as a second-half substitute for Edgar Davids and converted his penalty as the Dutch won 5–4 on penalties. The Dutch, however, were eliminated by the hosts Portugal in the semi-finals.

2006 World Cup
Heitinga's development as a player suffered two dips in form in the 2004–05 and the 2005–06 seasons, respectively. Despite club struggles, Heitinga never lost his spot in the national team under Marco van Basten, who took over as Dutch national coach in the summer of 2004. By the end of 2005, had also once again become a key player in the Ajax squad. He would also be selected by Van Basten for the Dutch team of 23 players to compete in the 2006 FIFA World Cup, hosted by Germany. The Dutch side performed reasonably well at the World Cup, qualifying for the second round before again being knocked out by Portugal.

Euro 2008

Heitinga was also called up to the Dutch squad for Euro 2008 in Austria and Switzerland. Since Euro 2008, he has been a regular in the right back position and has occasionally deputised in other defensive positions during an injury crisis. He made his 50th appearance for the Netherlands in a friendly against Paraguay on 18 November 2009.

2010 World Cup

Heitinga was included in the squad for the 2010 FIFA World Cup in South Africa, and was in the starting line-up for the Netherlands' first match in the competition, a 2–0 victory over Denmark. Heitinga played in every game as the Netherlands reached the final for the third time, where they faced Spain. He started the match but was sent off in the 109th minute after being given his second yellow card for a foul on Andrés Iniesta.
He became the fifth player to be sent off in a World Cup final. The Netherlands went on to lose the final 1–0 after Iniesta scored the winning goal for Spain in the 116th minute.

Career statistics

Club

International

Scores and results list the Netherlands' goal tally first, score column indicates score after each Heitinga goal.

Managerial statistics

Honours 

Ajax
 Eredivisie: 2001–02, 2003–04
 KNVB Cup: 2001–02, 2005–06, 2006–07
 Johan Cruyff Shield: 2002, 2005, 2006, 2007

Netherlands
 FIFA World Cup: runner-up 2010

Individual
 Amsterdam Sportsman of the Year: 2001
 Ajax Talent of the Future (Sjaak Swart Award): 2000–01
 Dutch Football Talent of the Year: 2003–04
 Dutch Footballer of the Year: 2007–08
 Everton Player of the Season: 2011–12

Notes

References

External links

Johnny Heitinga – Official website
Profile 

Premier League profile
Profile at EvertonFC.com

1983 births
Living people
Indo people
Dutch people of Indonesian descent
Sportspeople of Indonesian descent
Dutch footballers
Footballers from Alphen aan den Rijn
Association football defenders
Netherlands international footballers
Netherlands youth international footballers
UEFA Euro 2004 players
2006 FIFA World Cup players
2010 FIFA World Cup players
UEFA Euro 2008 players
UEFA Euro 2012 players
Eredivisie players
La Liga players
Premier League players
Bundesliga players
SV ARC players
AFC Ajax players
Atlético Madrid footballers
Everton F.C. players
Fulham F.C. players
Hertha BSC players
Dutch football managers
AFC Ajax non-playing staff
Jong Ajax managers
Eerste Divisie managers
Dutch expatriate footballers
Dutch expatriate sportspeople in Spain
Expatriate footballers in Spain
Dutch expatriate sportspeople in England
Expatriate footballers in England
Dutch expatriate sportspeople in Germany
Expatriate footballers in Germany